Seyyal Taner (born September 28, 1952) is a Turkish singer and actress.

Early life and career beginnings 
Taner was born in Şanlıurfa, Turkey, and later moved to Istanbul with her family. She graduated from the Amerikan Kız Lisesi. She received vocal training from Şerif Yüzbaşıoğlu in 1965 and started to sing as an amateur with the Kanat Gür Orkestrası.

In 1968 Los Bravos played in Istanbul and, having caught her act, offered Taner a role in a Spanish musical. Whilst promoting in Spain, she attracted the attention of Paramount Pictures and was offered a small part in Villa Rides. On returning to Turkey, Taner continued her acting career until she left for Germany and marriage to Peter Harold, Los Bravos's guitarist. The couple had a daughter; after divorcing, Taner returned to Turkey and began directing her career toward music.

Career 
Taner signed a record deal with the 1 Numara Plakçılık, a label belonging to Ali Kocatepe. Her debut 45 rpm record "Tanrı Şahidimdir – Şimdi Sen Varsın" was released in 1974. The following year, her second single "Nene Hatun – Yalnızlığı Bir de Bana Sor" was released. However, her first two records did not bring her great success. Meanwhile, she began an acting career, with "Lalezar Gazinosu." Later, she took to the stage as a group with Seyhan Karabay and Sedat Avcı. In 1976, she transferred to Yavuz Asöcal's record company and released her third single "Son Verdim Kalbimin İşine – Elveda" which was a success, as was her film Çizmeli Kedi that same year. Other 1970s singles include "Kalbimi Affettim", "Seni Çok Özledim," "Gülme Komşuna." In 1980, she released her first album "Lider," and in 1986, her second: "Leyla". In 1979, she appeared on TRT with Halil Ergün with a presentation of the first Turkish TV musical Çırpınış, a version of Asiye Nasıl Kurtulur. She opened a dance school with Sait Sökmen and taught dancers for show business, including Hakan Peker.

With the song "Dünya" Taner came second in the Turkish National Final for the Eurovision Song Contest 1986. The following year, she and the group Lokomotif came first with the song "Şarkım Sevgi Üstüne". They failed to score any points and finished last in the 1987 Eurovision Song Contest. After the result, she took a break. Then she returned to music and recorded "Nanay". Other 1980s singles include "Elalem Ne Der", "Naciye", "Leyla", "Nanay" and "Neler Oluyor".
 
In 1990, Taner moved to Bodrum. In 1991, she released the album "Alladı Pulladı" for which she contributed some lyrics and music. Early 1990s singles include "Alladı Pulladı", "Şiirimin Dili", "Kırk Yılık Kani", "La Havle Ya Settar". In 1993, she released "Geliyorum", after which she took a long break from music.
 
In 2002, Taner released her best of album "Seyyalname", "En İyileriyle Seyyal Taner" in 2005 and "En İyileriyle Seyyal Taner 2" in 2007. In 2007, she duetted "Erkek Adamsın" with Zakkum in his first studio album. In March 2012, she released her maxi-single album; Ethnic Rock. and toured. In 2014, she sang "Canımsın Deme Bana" on the "Wonderland" album of İlhan Erşahin.

Taner has many gay fans and is considered a Turkish gay icon. According to the LGBT magazine, KAOS GL, she is their "greatest gay icon."

Discography

Studio albums
 Lider (1981)
 Leyla (1986)
 Nanay (1989)
 Alladı Pulladı (1991)
 Kalbimi Affettim (1993)
 Geliyorum (1993)
 Seyyalname (2002)

EPs
 Ethnic Rock (2012)
 3'Lü (2014)

LP recordings
 Tanrı Şahidimdir – Şimdi Sen Varsın (Bir Numara, 1974) (writer(s), Ali Kocatepe)
 Nene Hatun – Yalnızlığı Bir de Bana Sor (Bir Numara, 1975) (writer (s), Ali Kocatepe, Doğan Canku, et al.)
 Son Verdim Kalbimin İşine – Elveda (Yavuz, 1976) (writer (s), Ülkü Aker.)
 Kalbimi Affettim – Sarmaş Dolaş (Yavuz, 1976) (writer (s), Ülkü Aker, et al.)
 Gülme Komşuna Gelir Başına – Seni Çok Özledim (Yavuz, 1977) (writer (s) Çiğdem Talu and Melih Kibar)
 Sorma Neydi O – Neden Gelmedin (Yavuz, 1977) (writer (s) Çiğdem Talu and Melih Kibar)
 Şarkım Sevgi Üstüne-Une Melodie (TRT, 1987) (Şarkım Sevgi Üstüne)

Compilations featuring Seyyal Taner
 En İyileriyle Seyyal Taner 2 (Ossi Music, 1986)
 En İyileriyle Seyyal Taner (Ossi Music, 2005)
 The Best of Seyyal Taner (Elenor, 2009)

Filmography

References

External links 

 
 

1952 births
People from Şanlıurfa
Eurovision Song Contest entrants of 1987
Eurovision Song Contest entrants for Turkey
Turkish women singers
Turkish rock singers
Living people